The Martin House is a historic house located at 707 10th Avenue in Fulton, Illinois. The Italianate house was built in 1855, when the style was becoming popular nationally. The house features a hip roof with bracketed eaves, tall windows, and a bay window on the east side, all distinctive Italianate elements. A wraparound front porch, a Queen Anne element, was added circa 1898. A 1908 renovation of the entry hall and dining room added Eastlake elements to the former and gave the latter an Arts and Crafts design.

The house was added to the National Register of Historic Places on December 22, 2014.

References

Houses on the National Register of Historic Places in Illinois
National Register of Historic Places in Whiteside County, Illinois
Italianate architecture in Illinois
Houses completed in 1855